Warburton is surname that derives from the name of the village in Greater Manchester (formerly in Cheshire), England.

People with the name include:

Surname 
 List of people with surname Warburton

Given or middle name 
 Warburton Gamble (1882–1945), English stage and film actor
 Warburton Pike (1861–1915), English explorer
 Adolphus Warburton Moore (1841–1887), British civil servant and mountaineer
 Sir Charles Warburton Meredith (1896–1977), Rhodesian Air Vice-Marshal
 Denis Warburton Begbie (1914–2009), South African cricketer
 Sir Howard Warburton Elphinstone, 3rd Baronet (1830 or 1831–1917), English baronet and legal academic
 James Warburton Begbie (1826–1876), Scottish physician
 John Warburton Paul (1916–2004), British government official
 John Warburton Sagar (1878–1941), English rugby player and diplomat
 Leonard Warburton Matters (1881–1951), Australian journalist and UK politician
 Patrick Warburton (born 1964), American actor and voice actor
 Philip Warburton Oland (1910–1996), Canadian businessman
 William Warburton (24 December 1698 – 7 June 1779), English writer and clergyman